Will Robinson (born 20 February 1971) is an Australian rugby league footballer who played professionally in England and Australia.

Playing career
Robinson started his career with the Balmain Tigers in 1990, debuting against Newcastle. In 1992 Robinson played for the Australian Aboriginies in the 1992 Pacific Cup. He was named in the team of the tournament, on the bench. Usually a five eighth or halfback in 1994, his final season with the Tigers, he moved into the centres.

He then spent two seasons with the South Sydney Rabbitohs, also playing at hooker. Robinson spent 1997 and 1998 with the Illawarra Steelers.  Robinson played in Illawarra's final ever game in the top grade which was a 25–24 loss against Canterbury-Bankstown in Round 24 1998 at WIN Stadium.

Robinson then moved to England, spending 1999 with the Gateshead Thunder before joining Hull F.C. for the 2000 season.

Robinson then returned to his hometown of Coonabarabran where he led the Unicorns to its inaugural Group 4 First Grade Premiership victory over the North Tamworth Bears in 2003.

References

1971 births
Living people
Australian Aboriginal rugby league team players
Australian rugby league players
Balmain Tigers players
Hull F.C. players
Illawarra Steelers players
Indigenous Australian rugby league players
Newcastle Thunder players
Rugby league five-eighths
Rugby league halfbacks
Rugby league players from Dubbo
South Sydney Rabbitohs players